The Dewoitine P-2 was a glider built by Dewoitine in the early 1920s.

Specifications (variant specified)

References

External links
 

P-2
1920s French sailplanes
Aircraft first flown in 1922
Glider aircraft